The X tax is an approach to taxation, suggested in the United States, that can be described as a standard European-style
credit-invoice value added tax (VAT), except that wages are deducted by businesses and taxed at progressive rates to workers.  Businesses are taxed on gross receipts and individuals taxed on wages, with neither businesses or individuals paying tax on financial transactions or financial instruments.  The plan was created by Princeton University economist and New York University School of Law professor David F. Bradford.

Bradford states the X tax could alleviate the complexities and avoidance issues plaguing the existing U.S. system, and argues that "the government should exempt from taxation all dividends, interest, and other income from savings. That way, people will be treated equally by the tax system, whether they choose to spend now or save to increase their future spending power."

See also
FairTax
Income tax in the United States
Taxation in the United States
Tax reform

Notes

External links

Bradford's Working Papers, National Bureau of Economic Research

Tax reform in the United States